Bondhere District is an ancient district in the districts of Banadir region in Somalia. This district is crossed by the following roads: General Daoud road that passes through Bondhere from Wardhiigley District. Upper Jubadan Road that passes through Shibis District. Ummada Road or as it is called "Wadnaha" which passes through Yaqshid District. Lower Juba road that passes through Shingani District. Nasib Bundo Road which divides Bondhere District and Shabelle Road which borders Bondhere and Hamarweyne Districts.

Suburbs 

 Shanta-Geed
 Nasiib-Buundo
 Al-Ahraam
 Wiil-Waal
 Busleeyda
 Buur-Bishaaro
 Ceel Aw-Muude
 Ceel-Macalin
 Buulo-Maqaarey
 Buulo-Ukun
 Ceel-Xaaji Haruur
 Yusuf Al-Kowneyn
 Daljirka Dahsoon
 Forno
 Nalka Hoose
 Nalka Kore
 Siinaay
 Nabada
 Aku doto
 Maxmabaare

Government facilities 

 Ministry of Interior and Federal Affairs
 Ministry of Information, Posts and Telecommunication
 Ministry of Education, Culture and Higher Education
 Ministry of Industry and Trade
 Ministry of Health

Schools 

 Yassin Osman Primary School
 12 October Primary School
 Kacaanka Primary School (ex Boondhere School)
 Wiilwaal Primary School
 Sh. Hassan Barsame High School
 Sh. Yusuf Al-Kowneyn High School
 Saacid High School

Mosques 

 Mowlaca Sh. Hussain Ade Mosque
 Buurfuule Mosque
 Sh. Osman Mocow Mosque
 Suuqa Af-Leershe Mosque
 Al-Raxma (Sh. Abukar Macalim) Mosque
 Xaaji Isse Mosque
 Xaaji Yabaroow Mosque
 Mowlaca Sh. Ali Cambar Mosque
 Cadaawe Mosque
 Sh. Muhammad Faqi Yusuf Mosque
 Reer Sh. Ahmed Jimale Mosque
 Sh. Mohamed Faqi Abore Mosque
 Mowlaca Sh. Adde Cili Mosque
 Mowlaca Dhagey Mosque

References

Districts of Somalia
Administrative map of Bondhere District

Districts of Somalia
Banaadir